Para todos la Dos/ Para todos La 2 (word game in Spanish language meaning La 2 for everybody and phonetically Para todos lados means  to/for everywhere or to/for every part) is a Spanish talk show by RTVE and broadcast from Sant Cugat's regional studios. The show now broadcast live, every Saturday at 12:00 p.m. Originally, the show was shown live at ~12 p.m. UTC+01:00 and pre-recorded at 7 pm UTC+01:00 (from Monday to Friday).

Host(s)

Current
Marta Càceres

Former
 Juanjo Pardo
 Montse Tejera (first season).

Segments (usual collaborators)
Science: Clemente Álvarez, Concepción Sanz, Daniel Closa
Pets: Carolina Pinedo
Nutrition: Eulàlia Vidal
Economy, consume, business, innovation and internet: Alejandro Martínez Berriochoa, Antonella Broglia, Raimon Samsó, Salva Marsal
Philosophy: Jorge de los Santos, Maite Larrauri, Mónica Esgueva
History: Dolors Elías, Fransesc de Dalmases
Humor: Ángel Rielo
Language: Jorge Enrique Gargallo
Psychology: Francesc Torralba, Patricia Ramírez, Rafael Santandreu, Teresa Baró, Silvia Congost, Toño Fraguas
Sexuality: Valérie Tasso
Television: Raúl Díaz

References

External links

Spanish reality television series
Spanish television talk shows
RTVE shows
2005 Spanish television series debuts
2000s Spanish television series
2010s Spanish television series